JISA is the Japan Information Industry Association.

Jisa may refer to:
 Jisa-ye Danial
 Jisa-ye Kelarabad
 Jisa-ye Khezrabad

Jișa may refer to:
 Jișa River, a river in Romania